The X-Men are a team of mutant superheroes, published in American comic books by Marvel Comics. Over the decades, the X-Men have featured a rotating line up composed of many characters.

Notation:
 Characters in bold are members of the team as of the present time.
 A slash (/) between names indicates codenames of one character in chronological order.
 Characters listed are set in the Earth-616 continuity except when noted.

X-Men

Original members

20th century recruits

21st century recruits

Other status

Substitute teams

New Mutants graduate X-Men 
In 1986, the New Mutants briefly graduated to become the X-Men in Uncanny X-Men Annual #10.

Muir Island X-Men 
In 1989, in the wake of the X-Men's "death" during "The Fall of the Mutants", Banshee assembled a team of X-Men on Muir Island in Uncanny X-Men #254 to #255.

Phalanx invasion X-Men 
In 1994, to oppose the threat of the techno-organic alien Phalanx, a team of X-Men was quickly banded together in Uncanny X-Men #316.

Mannite rescue X-Men 
In 1999, after Professor X disbanded the X-Men in an attempt to expose a Skrull impostor in their ranks, Cyclops and Jean Grey formed a team to help the Mannites in Astonishing X-Men, vol. 2 #1.

Genoshan assault X-Men 
In 2001, Jean Grey recruited a team in Uncanny X-Men #392 in order to rescue Professor X from Magneto.

Street team X-Men 
In 2004, a team was formed by Cyclops in the wake of Xorn's rampage through Manhattan, New York in New X-Men #149 and #150.

X-Men in training 
Mutants to be trained as a junior team of X-Men.

X-Force 
In 2008, the X-Men's strike team was formed by Cyclops in Uncanny X-Men #493, with Wolverine serving as the field leader. The team took on missions which required responses too violent or controversial for the X-Men to deal with directly. When Cyclops disbanded the team, Wolverine assembled a new team.

X-Club 
In 2009, Beast gathered a team in Uncanny X-Men #504 to attempt to deal with the mutant birth crisis, and reverse the effects of M-Day. The team lasted until 2012.

Time-displaced X-Men
Headlined All-New X-Men from 2012 to 2017 and X-Men Blue from 2017 to 2018.

London X-Men 
In 2017, a team was formed to help Charles Xavier against the Shadow King in Astonishing X-Men, vol. 4.

Secret X-Men 
A team formed in Secret X-Men #1 (2022), tasked with saving the daughter of Charles Xavier and Lilandra.

Unofficial 
The teams who have used the name of the X-Men without the permission of the official X-Men. They were either opposed to the X-Men altogether, or used the name to promote themselves to the public.

Cerebro's X-Men
 
Nanotechnology imposter team formed in 1998 by a sentient Cerebro posing as Professor X.

Great Lakes X-Men
In 2005, served a cease and desist for his team's use of the Avengers name, Mr. Immortal reorganized the Great Lakes Avengers into a team of unofficial X-Men in G.L.A. #4. They have since changed their name to first Great Lakes Champions and then Great Lakes Initiative.

Norman Osborn's X-Men

In 2009, a team of X-Men assembled by Norman Osborn during the "Utopia" storyline as part of the overarching "Dark Reign" event.

X-Men Green
A rogue team formed in 2021 to combat environmental destruction.

See also 
 List of Xavier Institute students and staff
 List of X-Men enemies

References 

X-Men members, List of
X-Men